David Stephen Pearl (born 11 August 1944) is a British lawyer and member of the Judicial Appointments Commission.  He is the son of Rabbi Chaim Pearl.

Pearl was educated at the University of Birmingham (LLB) and at Queens' College, Cambridge (LLM, MA, PhD) prior to being called to the Bar at Gray's Inn in 1968. He then lectured in law at the University of Cambridge, where he was a fellow of Fitzwilliam College and wrote the first comprehensive textbook of Muslim law for British students. He later served as dean of law at the University of East Anglia. He became the chief adjudicator of immigration appeals in 1994, and then president of the Immigration Appeal Tribunal in 1997. He was director of studies at the Judicial Studies Board (1999–2002) and has been president of the Care Standards Tribunal since 2002. Pearl was appointed as a member of the Judicial Appointments Commission since January 2006, representing tribunals.

Selected bibliography
 A Textbook on Muslim Law, Croom Helm 1979. 
 Family, Law and Society: Cases and Materials, Butterworths 1991 (with Brenda M. Hoggett). 
 Muslim Family Law, Sweet & Maxwell 1998 (with Werner Menski). 
 Butterworths Handbook on Immigration Law, Butterworths 1999 (with Eugene Cotran, Julia Onslow-Cole).

References 

 Debrett's People of Today 2006
 Who's Who 2007

1944 births
Alumni of Queens' College, Cambridge
Legal scholars of the University of Cambridge
Academics of the University of East Anglia
Fellows of Fitzwilliam College, Cambridge
Living people
Alumni of the University of Birmingham
Fellows of Queens' College, Cambridge
Members of Gray's Inn
Scholars of Islamic jurisprudence
British Islamic studies scholars